For Whom the Beat Tolls (a play on the Ernest Hemingway novel For Whom the Bell Tolls, which itself is drawn from "Meditation XVII" of Devotions upon Emergent Occasions, a series of essays by metaphysical poet John Donne) is the eighth studio album by rapper Canibus, released through Mic Club Music on May 29, 2007 in the United States and June 5 worldwide. It features the new "Poet Laureate Infinity" concept, which involves mixing 200 bar layers with corresponding ones in order to create various subject matter, rhymes and overall sound. The album leaked on the Internet on June 4, 2007. According to Canibus' DJ, Puerto Roc, the album has sold 60,000 copies as of October 2007.

Reception

For Whom The Beat Tolls received generally positive reviews from critics.

Steve Juon of RapReviews.com called it "the latest and greatest Canibus album", noting how "from the eerie Indian backdrop of 'The Fusion Centre' to the futuristic booming beats of 'The Goetia' to the epic musical groove of 'Secrets Among Cosmonauts' Canibus keeps doing what he does best over and over again: spitting raw energy in his raps over stellar tracks."

Playda's Reviews gave the album 8.5 out of 10, saying "Canibus sounds more focused than ever, bringing much-needed lyrical heat to a year lacking just that" and calling For Whom The Beat Tolls "easily one of the best albums of 2007 so far(not to mention being Canibus' best effort since Rip the Jacker, if it wasn't obvious enough) and definitely worth your money"

Track listing

Personnel
Information taken from the album's liner notes.
Executive producers – Louis Lombard III, K-Solo, Paul Holyfield
Engineers – Victor Flores
Mixers – 'Pistol' Pete Heinz
Mastered by David Scharf/In Fidelity
Canibus photography – Susan von Detten
Art direction – Louis Lombard III
Graphic design and image compositing – AN.X Agency
All other photography – Moonmeister, Travelling-Light, Kirschbam, Albo, Mamay, Piccaya, Onefivenine, Ebe, Echophoto, DWPhotos
A&R – Scott Free

References

External links
Canibus Online

2007 albums
Canibus albums